Leon L. Van Autreve (January 29, 1920 – March 14, 2002) was a United States Army soldier who served as the fourth Sergeant Major of the Army. He was sworn in on July 1, 1973, and served until June 1975.

Early life and education
Van Autreve was born in Eeklo, Belgium, on January 29, 1920.

Van Autreve attended George Washington University, University of Toledo, University of Maryland and Alaska Methodist University, and was a member of Phi Alpha Theta.

Military career
Van Autreve entered the United States Army in August 1941 from Delphos, Ohio. After basic training at Fort Belvoir, he served overseas with the 9th Infantry Division and participated in the invasion of Port Lyautey, Morocco. He was discharged in August 1945 and enlisted again in March 1948. After a tour in Germany from 1950 to 1954, he served as an instructor with the Reserve Officer Training Corps (ROTC) at the University of Toledo until 1958. From ROTC duty he was assigned to Continental Army Command Armor Board at Fort Knox, Kentucky, remaining there until reassignment to South Korea in 1960. Upon completion of his tour in South Korea, Van Autreve returned to Fort Belvoir and was promoted to sergeant major in 1962. He served as sergeant major of the 91st Engineer Battalion from 1962 until 1963.

From 1963 to 1964, Van Autreve was stationed in Indonesia, 1964 to 1967 in West Germany as sergeant major, 317th Engineer Battalion, and 1967 to 1969 in South Vietnam as sergeant major of the 20th Engineer Brigade. In July 1969 he was selected for assignment to Alaska as the command sergeant major, where he remained until he was selected as the Sergeant Major of the Army.

Sergeant Major of the Army
Van Autreve saw increasing the standards of the army's non-commissioned officer (NCO) corps as his highest priority. As part of the rejuvenation of the NCO Corps, Van Autreve gave NCOs more voice in command decisions, reduced the army's reliance on soldiers' councils, increased professional standards for NCOs, developed the Noncommissioned Officer Education System, and encouraged NCOs to have the moral courage to police their own ranks.

Later life and legacy
In 1994, the Sergeant Audie Murphy Club designated Fort Sam Houston, Texas, as the SMA Van Autreve Chapter.

Van Autreve died on March 14, 2002, in San Antonio, Texas.

Awards and decorations

References

The Sergeants Major of the Army, Daniel K. Elder, Center of Military History, United States Army Washington, D.C. 2003.

United States Army personnel of World War II
United States Army personnel of the Vietnam War
Recipients of the Distinguished Service Medal (US Army)
Recipients of the Legion of Merit
1920 births
2002 deaths
Belgian emigrants to the United States
Recipients of the Soldier's Medal
Recipients of the Air Medal
Sergeants Major of the Army
American expatriates in Germany